The correndera pipit (Anthus correndera) is a species of bird in the family Motacillidae.
It is found in Argentina, Bolivia, southern Brazil, Chile, the Falkland Islands, Paraguay, Peru,  and Uruguay.
Its natural habitats are temperate grassland, subtropical or tropical high-altitude grassland, and pastureland.

References

Anthus
Birds of South America
Birds of Argentina
Birds of Bolivia
Birds of Brazil
Birds of Chile
Birds of Peru
Birds of Paraguay
Birds of Uruguay
Birds of the Falkland Islands
Birds described in 1818
Taxa named by Louis Jean Pierre Vieillot
Taxonomy articles created by Polbot